Nikola Ivanović (born 20 January 1989) is a Serbian football forward.

References

External links
 
 Nikola Ivanović stats at utakmica.rs 
 

1989 births
Living people
Sportspeople from Čačak
Association football defenders
Serbian footballers
FK Borac Čačak players
FK Mladost Lučani players
FK Radnički 1923 players
FK Čukarički players
FK Javor Ivanjica players
Serbian SuperLiga players
Serbian expatriate footballers
Serbian expatriate sportspeople in Slovenia
Serbian expatriate sportspeople in Greece
Expatriate footballers in Greece
Expatriate footballers in Slovenia
NK Celje players